Sapolio was a brand of soap noted for its advertising, led by Artemas Ward from 1883–1908. Bret Harte wrote jingles for the brand, and the sales force also included King Camp Gillette, who went on to create the Gillette safety razor and the razor and blades business model. Time magazine described Sapolio as "probably the world's best-advertised product" in its heyday.

Sapolio was manufactured by Enoch Morgan's Sons Co. from 1869, and named by the family doctor.

James Kenneth Fraser, a copywriter and Cornell University engineering student, wrote in 1900 about the effectiveness of the soap in The Doctor's Lament:

Decline and disappearance
After decades of maintaining some of the best known advertising in the U.S., Sapolio's owners decided that their position was sufficiently insurmountable as to let them discontinue most advertising. Despite the brand's overwhelming market position, it was overtaken by competitors within a few years and disappeared from the market before World War II.

Revival
After the disappearance of the brand Sapolio, the name remained under the domain of Enoch Morgan's Sons Co. until after some negotiations, the brand was acquired by Procter & Gamble, but they did not decide to relaunch the product until a lot of years later, leaving the brand Sapolio completely abandoned.

In 1997, the Sapolio brand was acquired by the Peruvian company Intradevco Industrial SA, who bought it from Procter & Gamble. Intradevco owns the Sapolio brand in more than 80 countries. The Sapolio brand is now used to market various cleaning products in Peru and Chile.

The Intradevco company also bought its Chilean counterpart Klenzo, which held the Sapolio patent in Chile.

In 2019, the Alicorp company bought the rights of the Intradevco company, which owns Sapolio, making it its parent company.

References in popular culture
In the children's book, The Hundred Dresses, the main character wonders if Wanda uses Sapolio to get her forehead to shine.
Confidence man Soapy Smith was often called Sapolio Smith by the Rocky Mountain News.
In the Ed Smalle, Jerry Macy version of Singing in the Bathtub (1930) Sapolio is used as a pun "I Sapolio you think you're smart."
In Robert Heinlein's To Sail Beyond the Sunset, Brian Smith (circa 1906) asks his wife "Mo, the papers say that food prices are up even though the farmers are squawking. And I'm certain that this bigger house is costing you more to run, if only in electricity, gas and Sapolio. How much more each month do you need?"
In the book, 60 years with Men and Machines, by Colvin, Fred H., (pages 122 - 123) references are made to use of Sapolio as an abrasive use in the manufacture of automobile engines, when required fine lapping was performed by hand labor. 
In the 1905 novel, The House of Mirth, by Edith Wharton, (Book I - Chapter IX) a reference is made to "the mingled odour of sapolio and furniture-polish".

See also
 List of cleaning products
 Alicorp

References

External links 
 
 
 
 A History of Advertising through Sapolio Soap Ads -Mesugo Design

Soap brands